Mog may refer to:

Entertainment

Characters
 Mog (Final Fantasy VI), in the game
 Mog (Judith Kerr), a cat in Kerr's children's books
 Mog, a half-man/half-dog in the film Spaceballs
 A cat in the Meg and Mog children's books by Helen Nicoll
 Invaders from Mogadore in the book series Lorien Legacies by Pittacus Lore

Other
 MOG (online music), an online music website
 Mog (TV series), UK
 Multiplayer online game

People
 Mog (Abenaki leader) (1663-1724)
 Mog, Palatine of Hungary (died after 1210)
 MOG Music, Ghanaian contemporary gospel singer

Places
 Monghsat Airport (IATA code: MOG), Monghsat, Burma
 Moorgate railway station, London, UK, National Rail code

Science and mathematics
 Miracle Octad Generator, a mathematical tool
 Modified gravity theory
 Myelin oligodendrocyte glycoprotein, a glycoprotein
 MOG antibody disease, an inflammatory demyelinating disease of the central nervous system

Other uses
 MOG (wine), material other than grapes
 Mog people, an Arakanese population in Tripura, India
 Mog language
 Moog Inc. (NYSE: MOG.A and MOG.B)
 Machinery of government

See also
 Mogmog (Mwagmwog), an island in the Ulithi atoll, Caroline Islands
 Moggie (disambiguation)